The Untouchables Paderborn (full name Untouchables Paderborn Baseball Club e.V.), is a German baseball team in the Baseball-Bundesliga located in the city of Paderborn in Nordrhein-Westfalen.  The club was established in 1990.

The Untouchables' club colors are black, green, and yellow, and the nickname is U's.  The Untouchables won every Baseball-Bundesliga championship between 1999 and 2005.  The Untouchables have also won the junior Baseball-Bundesliga in 2003, the youth Baseball-Bundesliga in 2002 and 2004, the men's Cup (DBV-Pokal) in 1998 and 1999, and the European Cup in 2003.  The Untouchables compete in the 1st Bundesliga North division of the Baseball-Bundesliga.  The team finished in second place in the Bundesliga Nord in 2010, ultimately losing in the semifinals to ultimate champion Regensburg Legionare.  The Untouchables play at the Ahorn-Ballpark, one of the biggest baseball stadiums in Germany, with a capacity of about 1,200 spectators.

Season by Season Performance (1st Bundesliga)

2010 Squad

Pitchers 

Catchers 

Infielders 

Outfielders 

Coaches

References

External links
Official Site

Baseball teams in Germany
Paderborn